Lille-Kamøya is an uninhabited mountainous island in Hammerfest Municipality in Troms og Finnmark county, Norway.

Lille Karmøya has the largest shag colony in Norway. The island and surrounding sea are protected as Lille Karmøya Nature Reserve.

See also
List of islands of Norway

References

Hammerfest
Uninhabited islands of Norway
Islands of Troms og Finnmark